The 1997–98 Australian Baseball League season was the 9th season of the original Australian Baseball League, contested between eight teams representing state and regional capitals: , , , , , ,  and . The Melbourne Reds became the first three-time champions defeating the Gold Coast Cougars 2 games to 0 in the Championship series, in front of a small home crowd of 600 at the Melbourne Ballpark.

Teams

Each of the 8 teams from the previous season returned, however the Sydney Blues changed their name to the Sydney Storm after legal action taken by Cricket NSW during the offseason.

In the season opening press release, The league called for expressions of interest in a licence to reform the Canberra Bushrangers for the  season, The Bushrangers previously folded at the end of the  season.

Rosters 
During the regular season each team made use of an active roster of 22–24 men, with a maximum of 4 import players.

1997–98 Melbourne Monarchs season#Roster
1997–98 Melbourne Reds season#Roster
1997–98 Perth Heat season#Roster
1997–98 Sydney Storm season#Roster

Venues

Regular season

Round 1: 31 October – 5 November 1997

Round 2: 7–9 November 1997

Round 3: 14–16 November 1997

Round 4: 21–23 November 1997

Round 5: 28–30 November 1997

Round 6: 5–7 December 1997

All Star Games: 12–13 December 1997

The All-Stars Weekend, was the first series of All-Star exhibition games held by the Australian Baseball League. The games were contested over two nights at Carrara Oval on the Gold Coast, The then home of the Gold Coast Cougars franchise.

The games were played between the Australian All-Stars, USA All-Stars and the 1997 Japanese Industrial League Champions the Mitsubishi Juko Kobe. The Australian and USA All-Star teams were selected from players who were at the time playing in the Australian Baseball League.

Game 1: Australian All-Stars vs Mitsubishi Juko Kobe

Game 2: Australian All-Stars vs USA All-Stars

Round 7: 14–16 December 1997

Round 8: 19–21 December 1997

Round 9: 26–28 December 1997

Round 10: 30 December 1997, 2–6 January 1998

Round 11: 9–11 January 1998

Round 12: 16–18 January 1998

Round 13: 22–25 January 1998

Round 14: 26–29 January 1998

Round 15: 30 January – 3 February 1998

Round 16: 6–8 February 1998

Ladder

Top 10 Stats

Postseason

Finals Series at Melbourne Ballpark
In previous years the post season was played as home and away best of 3 games, with the two winner of each series meeting for a best of 5 series{fact}, in 1997–98 this was changed to a round robin play-off format with each team playing 3 games, 1 against each of the other 3 qualified teams, with the two highest places teams playing off in the Championship Series.

All games for the 9th ABL title were played at the Melbourne Ballpark from February, 10-12 with the best of three championship series 14–15 February.

Finals Series

Game 1: 10 February 1998

Game 2: 10 February 1998

Game 3: 11 February 1998

Game 4: 11 February 1998

Game 5: 12 February 1998

Game 6: 12 February 1998

Postseason Ladder

Championship Series

Game 1: 14 February 1998

Game 2: 15 February 1998

Awards

All-Star Team

References 

 

 
Australian Baseball League (1989–1999) seasons
Australian Baseball League season, 1997–98
Australian Baseball League season, 1997–98